Holcophoroides is a genus of moths in the family Gelechiidae. It contains the species Holcophoroides nigripes, which is found in Japan.

References

Gelechiinae